Rock Out may refer to:

 "Rock Out" (Pantera song), 1983
 "Rock Out" (Motörhead song), 2008
 "Rock Out", a song from Art Ensemble of Chicago's 1969 album Message to Our Folks

See also